This bibliography on Church policies 1939–1945 includes mainly Italian publications relative to Pope Pius XII and Vatican policies during World War II . Two areas are missing and need separate bibliographies at a later date.

 The bibliography does not include theology, theological issues and publications on the Theology of Pope Pius XII, Mariology of Pope Pius XII, on his ecclesiastical promulgations such as the dogma of the Assumption of the Virgin Mary, Church reforms, or, the Beatifications of Pope Pius XII, Saints canonized by Pope Pius XII, Encyclicals of the Pontiff and other theological issues.
 Policies after World War Two are also not included such as Pope Pius XII Church policies after World War II, Persecutions of the Catholic Church and Pius XII, and Vatican policies regarding the Church in Russia, Poland and China and other countries.

A 
 ADSS – Actes et Documents du Saint-Siège relatifs à la Seconde guerre mondiale. Libreria Editrice Vaticana, Città del Vaticano 1972. 
 Giorgio Angelozzi Gariboldi. Pio XII, Hitler e Mussolini. Mursia, Milano 1988. 
 Mark Aarons e John Loftus. Unholy Trinity: The Vatican, The Nazist and the Swiss Banks. St Martin's Press, New York 1998. . 
 David Alvaretz. Spie in Vaticano. Newton & Compton, Roma 2003.

B 
 Zygmunt Bauman. Modernità e Olocausto, trad. it. di Massimo Baldini, il Mulino, Bologna 1992, pp. 280,  (versione online)
 Gerhard Besier. Der heilige Stuhl und Hitler-Deutschland, Die Faszination des Totalitären. DVA, München 2004. . 
 Luigi Bizzarri. Il principe di Dio. La vera storia di Pio XII. Ancora 2004.
 Pierre Blet S.J. Pio XII e la seconda guerra mondiale negli archivi vaticani. Edizioni San Paolo, Cinisello Balsamo (MI) 1999, pp. 392, .
 Schneider Burkhart. Pio XII. Con un contributo del rabbino David Dalin in difesa del pontefice, Edizioni San Paolo, 2002, pp. 160,

C 
 Judith Cabaud. Il rabbino che si arrese a Cristo, Edizioni San Paolo, 2002
 Jorge Camarasa. Organizzazione Odessa. Mursia, Milano 1998. 
 James Carroll. Constantine’s Sword. The Church and the Jews: A History [La spada di Costantino. La Chiesa e gli ebrei. Una storia], Hougthon Mifflin Company, Boston (Massachusetts) 2001.
 Luigi Castiglione. Pio XII e il nazismo. Borla, Torino 1965.
 Philippe Chenaux. Pio XII. Diplomatico e Pastore. Edizioni San Paolo, 2004.
 John Cornwell. Il papa di Hitler (Hitler’s Pope: The Secret History of Pius XII, Viking 1999). Garzanti, Milano 2000. 
 Franco Cuomo. I dieci. Chi erano gli scienziati italiani che firmarono il manifesto della razza. Baldini Castoldi Dalai, Milano 2005.

D 
 Francesca Di Giovanni, Giuseppina Roselli. Inter arma caritas. L’Ufficio Informazioni Vaticano per i prigionieri di guerra, istituito da Pio XII (1939–1947), Archivio Segreto Vaticano, Città del Vaticano, 2004 .
 David G. Dalin. La leggenda nera del papa di Hitler (The Myth of Hitler's Pope). Piemme 2007

E

F 
 Carlo Falconi. Il silenzio di Pio XII. Papa Pacelli e il nazifascismo. Kaos, Milano 2006. 
 Emma Fattorini. Germania e Santa Sede. Le nunziature di Pacelli tra la Grande Guerra e la Repubblica di Weimar. Il Mulino, Bologna 1992. .
 Emma Fattorini, Pio XI, Hitler e Mussolini. La solitudine di un papa, Einaudi 2007
 Michael F. Feldkamp. Die Beziehungen der Bundesrepublik Deutschland zum Heiligen Stuhl 1949–1966. Aus den Vatikanakten des Auswärtigen Amts. Eine Dokumentation, Colonia et al., 2000,  
 Michael F. Feldkamp. Pius XII. und Deutschland, Göttingen 2000,  
 Michael F. Feldkamp. Goldhagens , Monaco di B., 2003,  
 Saul Friedländer. L’ambiguità del bene. Il caso del nazista pentito Kurt Gerstein. Mondadori, Milano 2002. 
 Saul Friedländer. Pio XII e il Terzo Reich. Documenti, Feltrinelli, Milano 1965.

G 
 Luigi Ganapini. La repubblica delle camicie nere. Garzanti, Milano 1999. 
 Carlo Gasbarri. Quando il Vaticano confinava con il Terzo Reich. Messaggero, Padova 1984. 
 Antonio Gaspari. Gli ebrei salvati da Pio XII, Logos, Roma 2001.
 Peter Godman. Hitler e il Vaticano. Dagli archivi segreti vaticani la vera storia dei rapporti fra il nazismo e la Chiesa (Der Vatikan und Hitler. Die geheimen Archive. Droemer, Ulm 2004). Lindau, Torino 2005. 
 Daniel Jonah Goldhagen. Una questione morale. La chiesa cattolica e l’olocausto. Mondadori, Milano 2003. 
 Uki Goni. Operazione Odessa. Garzanti, Milano 2003. 
 Giordano Bruno Guerri. Gli italiani sotto la chiesa. Mondadori, Milano 1992. 
 Patrick J. Gallo. Pius XII, the Holocaust and the Revisionists, 2006

H 
 Raul Hilberg. La distruzione degli ebrei d’Europa, trad. it., n. ed. riveduta e ampliata, a cura di Frediano Sessi, 2 voll., Einaudi, Torino 1999. 
 Rolf Hochhuth. Il Vicario, dramma in 5 atti, trad. it., con una prefazione di Carlo Bo, Feltrinelli, Milan 1964. (l'opera che per alcuni ha iniziato la "leggenda nera" su Pio XII)
 Rolf Hochhuth. Il vicario (Der Stellvertreter. Ein christliches Trauerspiel, 1963, trad. di I. Pizzetti). Wizarts Editore, P.S. Elpidio (AP), nuova ed. 2003. 
 Alois Hudal. Die Grundlagen des Nationalsozialismus: eine ideengeschichtliche Untersuchung von Katholischer Warte. Leipzig-Wien 1937.

I 
 Johan Ickx. Le Bureau. Les Juifs de Pie XII. Éditions VdH, Melsele 2020.

J

K 
 David Kertzer. I papi contro gli ebrei. Il ruolo del Vaticano nell’ascesa dell’antisemitismo moderno. Rizzoli, Milano 2002.

L 
 Annie Lacroix-Riz. Le Vatican, l’Europe et le Reich de la Premiere Guerre mondiale à la Guerre froide. Armand Colin, Paris 1996. . 
 Pinchas Emilio Lapide. Roma e gli ebrei. L’azione del Vaticano a favore delle vittime del Nazismo, trad. it., Mondadori, Milano 1967.
 Jeno Levai. Hungarian Jewry and the papacy. Pope Pius XII did not remain silent. Reports, documents and records from church and state archives assembled by Jeno Levai [L’ebraismo ungherese e il papato. Papa Pio XII non restò in silenzio. Resoconti, documenti e testimonianze dagli archivi ecclesiastici e statali raccolti da Jeno Levai], ed. inglese, con introduzione di Robert M. W. Kempner, Sands and Co. Ltd., Londra 1968.
 Guenter Lewy. I nazisti e la chiesa. Net, Milano, 2002. 
 Guenter Lewy. I nazisti e la Chiesa, trad. it., Il Saggiatore, Milano 1965.
 Joseph L. Lichten. Pio XII e gli ebrei, trad. it., Edizioni Dehoniane, Bologna 1988.

M 
 Marilyn Mallory, Pope Pius XII and the Jews: What's True and What's Fiction?, Amazon.com, Kindle 2012, pp. 220, ASIN: B006KLOARW
 Margherita Marchione, Pio XII e gli ebrei, Editoriale Pantheon, Roma 1999, Piemme, Casale Monferrato 2002, pp. 288, 
 Margherita Marchione, Pio XII attraverso le immagini, Libreria Editrice Vaticana, 2000, pp. 216, 
 Margherita Marchione, Pio XII. Architetto di pace, Editoriale Pantheon, Roma 2000, Piemme, Casale Monferrato 2002, pp. 416, 
 Margherita Marchione, Il silenzio di Pio XII, prefazione di Antonio Spinosa, traduzione di Ingenito M., Sperling & Kupfer, Milan 2002, pp. XXIV–308, 
 Margherita Marchione, La mia vita. Incontri con i papi e i letterati del '900, Libreria Ancora, Milano 2003, pp. 160, 
 Margherita Marchione, Pio XII. Il papa dei bambini, Editrice Shalom, Camerata Picena 2004, pp. 32, 
 Margherita Marchione, Pio XII è veramente un santo, Editrice Shalom, Camerata Picena 2004, pp. ..., ISBN ... (da verificare)
 Margherita Marchione, Crociata di carità. L'impegno di Pio XII per i prigionieri della seconda guerra mondiale, Sperling & Kupfer, 2006, pp. XXXII–414, 
 Ralph McInerny. The Defamation of Pius XII [La diffamazione di Pio XII], St. Augustine's, South Bend (Indiana) 2000.
 Gerald Messadié. Storia dell’antisemitismo. Piemme, Casale Monferrato (AL) 2002. 
 Giovanni Miccoli. I dilemmi e i silenzi di Pio XII. Rizzoli, Milano, 2000. 
 Georges Minois. La chiesa e la guerra. Dalla Bibbia all’era atomica. Dedalo, Bari 2003. 
 Renato Moro, La Chiesa e lo sterminio degli ebrei, Il Mulino, Bologna, 2002.

N 
 Matteo Luigi Napolitano e Andrea Tornielli. Il Papa che salvò gli ebrei. Dagli archivi segreti del Vaticano tutta la verità su Pio XII, Piemme, Casale Monferrato 2004, pp. 202, 
 Matteo Luigi Napolitano. Pio XII tra guerra e pace. Profezia e diplomazia di un papa (1939–1945), Città Nuova, 2002, pp. 294,

O

P 
 Giovanni Maria Pace. La via dei demoni. La fuga in Sudamerica dei criminali nazisti: segreti, complicità, silenzi. Sperling & Kupfer, Milano 2000. 
 Léon Papeleux. Les silences de Pie XII. Vokaer, Bruxelles 1980. 
 Georges Passelecq, Bernard Suchecky. L’enciclica nascosta di Pio XI. Un’occasione mancata dalla chiesa cattolica nei confronti dell’antisemitismo. Corbaccio, Milano 1997.

Q

R 
 Barbara Raggi, Ruggero Taradel. La segregazione amichevole. «La Civiltà Cattolica» e la questione ebraica 1850–1945, Editori Riuniti, Roma 2000. 
 Anthony Rhodes. Il Vaticano e le dittature: 1922–1945 (tit. or. The Vatican in the Age of the Dictators: 1922–1945. Hodder & Stoughton, London 1973). Mursia, Milano 1975. SBN IT\ICCU\RLZ\0038325
 Andrea Riccardi (a cura di), Pio XII, Laterza, Bari, 1985
 Ernesto Rossi. Il manganello e l’aspersorio. 1ª ed. Parenti, Firenze 1958. Nuova ed. Kaos, Milano 2000. 
 
 
 
 Robert Ventresca, Soldier of Christ. The Life of Pope Pius XII, Harvard University Press, 2013, p. 405,

S 
 Pietro Scoppola. La chiesa e il fascismo. Documenti e interpretazioni. 1ª ed. 1971. Nuova ed. con prefazione Laterza, Bari-Roma 2006. 
 Gitta Sereny. In quelle tenebre. 1ª ed. 1994. Nuova ed. Adelphi, Milano 2005. 
 Antonio Spinosa. Pio XII. Un papa nelle tenebre. 1ª ed. 1992. Nuova ed. Mondadori 2004.

T 
 Ruggero Taradel. L’accusa del sangue. Storia politica di un mito antisemita. Editori Riuniti, Roma 2002. 
 Gordon Thomas. The Pope's Jews. New York: Thomas Dunne, 2012. .
 Harold Tittmann. Il Vaticano di Pio XII. Uno sguardo dall'interno. Corbaccio, Milano 2005. 
 Andrea Tornielli. Pio XII. Il Papa degli ebrei. Piemme, Casale Monferrato 2002, pp. 411, 
 Andrea Tornielli. Pio XII. Eugenio Pacelli. Un uomo sul trono di Pietro. Mondadori 2007, pp. 661,
 Andrea Tornielli e Matteo Luigi Napolitano. Pacelli, Roncalli e i battesimi della Shoah, Piemme, Casale Monferrato 2005,

U

V 
 Guido Verucci. La chiesa nella società contemporanea. Laterza, Bari-Roma 1999.

W 
 Garry Wills Papal Sin. Structures of Deceit [Peccato pontificio. Strutture d’inganno], Doubleday, New York 2000.

X

Y

Z 
 Susan Zuccotti, Proprio sotto le sue finestre. Il Vaticano e l’olocausto in Italia, Mondadori, Milano 2002.

See also 
 Bibliography of World War II

Pius 12
Bibliographies of people